Taylor Walter-Lee Trammell (born September 13, 1997) is an American professional baseball outfielder for the Seattle Mariners of Major League Baseball (MLB). He made his MLB debut in 2021.

Early life
Trammell was born in Powder Springs, Georgia, the youngest son of Walter and Cynthia Trammell. His father worked in the U.S. Navy as a linguist and for the U.S. Postal Service. His mother worked at Sam's Club for more than twenty years. His older brother, Kyle, played college football for Mercer.

Trammell attended Mount Paran Christian School in Kennesaw, Georgia. He played both baseball and football. As a junior football player, he scored 13 touchdowns en route to a state championship and hit .500, drove in more than 30 runs and stole more than 30 bases for his travel baseball team. Trammell played in the Under Armour All-America Baseball Game in August 2015. Early in his senior year of high school, he was described in The Atlanta Journal-Constitution as "arguably Georgia's best two-sport stud." As a senior baseball player, he hit .463, stole 29 bases and hit nine home runs. He was also named the high school football Offensive Player of the Year in Georgia's smallest classification after rushing for 2,500 yards and 38 touchdowns. He committed to play college baseball for the Georgia Tech Yellow Jackets.

Career

Cincinnati Reds
Considered a top prospect for the 2016 Major League Baseball draft, the Cincinnati Reds selected Trammell with the 35th overall pick. He signed with the Reds and was assigned to the Billings Mustangs of the Rookie-level Pioneer League, posting a .303 batting average with two home runs, 34 RBIs, six triples and 24 stolen bases in 61 games. In 2017, he played for the Dayton Dragons of the Class A Midwest League, where he slashed .281/.368/.450 along with 13 home runs, 77 RBIs and 41 stolen bases in 129 games, and in 2018 he played for the Daytona Tortugas of the Class A-Advanced Florida State League, batting .277 with eight home runs, 41 RBIs and 25 stolen bases in 110 games. He represented the Reds in the All-Star Futures Game and was named the MVP of the game after hitting a go-ahead home run along with a triple. The Reds invited Trammell to spring training in 2019 as a non-roster player. He began 2019 with the Chattanooga Lookouts of the Class AA Southern League, and again appeared in the All-Star Futures Game.

San Diego Padres
On July 30, 2019, the Reds traded Trammell to the San Diego Padres in a three-team trade, where the Reds acquired Trevor Bauer and the Indians acquired Yasiel Puig, Scott Moss, Franmil Reyes, Logan Allen, and Victor Nova. The Padres assigned Trammell to the Amarillo Sod Poodles of the Class AA Texas League.

Seattle Mariners
On August 30, 2020, the Padres traded Trammell, Ty France, Andrés Muñoz, and Luis Torrens to the Seattle Mariners for Austin Nola, Dan Altavilla, and Austin Adams. On November 20, 2020, Trammell was added to the 40-man roster.

Trammell made his MLB debut for the Mariners on April 1, 2021 playing center field against the San Francisco Giants. In his debut he was walked twice, including drawing a bases loaded walk in the bottom of the eighth inning for his first MLB RBI. Trammell collected his first hit on April 3, an RBI double that scored Evan White, in the bottom of the fourth inning. He appeared in 51 games for Seattle in his rookie campaign, slashing .160/.256/.359 with 8 home runs and 18 RBI. In 2022, Trammell played in 43 games for the big league club, but again struggled to a .196/.284/.402 slash with 4 home runs and 10 RBI.

On February 15, 2023, it was announced that Trammell would undergo surgery to repair a broken hamate bone in his right hand. He had suffered the injury after being struck in the hand in a late offseason workout, with the break coming with a recovery time of 6-7 weeks.

References

External links

1997 births
Living people
People from Powder Springs, Georgia
Sportspeople from Cobb County, Georgia
Baseball players from Georgia (U.S. state)
African-American baseball players
Major League Baseball outfielders
Seattle Mariners players
Billings Mustangs players
Dayton Dragons players
Daytona Tortugas players
Scottsdale Scorpions players
Chattanooga Lookouts players
Amarillo Sod Poodles players
Tacoma Rainiers players
21st-century African-American sportspeople